Yelü Hou'abu, posthumous name Crown Prince Zhuangsheng, was an imperial prince of the Liao dynasty of China. He was the oldest son of the Emperor Shizong and Xiao Sagezhi. He was the oldest brother of the Emperor Jingzong. However, he died at a young age and when the Emperor Jingzong ascended to the throne, Hou'abu was formally honoured as the Crown Prince Zhuangsheng.

References

Year of birth unknown
Liao dynasty people
Year of death unknown
Yelü clan
10th-century Khitan people